Suberau Ghaam (IPA:sʊbeɾɔ gʰə:m; Garhwali:सुबेरौ घाम; English:The Morning Sunlight) is a Garhwali film directed by Naresh Khanna and produced by Urmi Negi. The film features Urmi Negi, Balraj Negi, Baldev Rana, Ghananand in the lead roles. The film is against the consumption of alcohol, and the dangers of alcoholism.

Cast

 Urmi Negi
 Balraj Negi
 Baldev Rana
 Ghananand
 Mir Ranjan Negi as Officer
 Bijju as himself

Soundtrack

See also
Jagwal, first Garhwali movie made in 1981 by Parasar Gaur

References

External links
 
  
 
 
 
 
 

Garhwali-language films
2014 films